Lauwers is a Dutch surname most common in Flanders. It may be of patronymic origin ("son of Laurens)" or indicate an occupation ("lawyer"). People with this surname include:

Balthasar Lauwers (1578-1645), Flemish landscape painter active in Rome
Barbara Lauwers (1914–2009), Czech lawyer and US Army soldier
Christophe Lauwers (born 1972), Belgian footballer
Conrad Lauwers (1622–1675), Flemish engraver
Daniel Lauwers (born 1963), American member of the Michigan Senate
:de:Dimitri Lauwers (born 1979), Belgian basketball player
Henk Lauwers (born 1956), Belgian baritone singer
:fr:Jan Lauwers (born 1957), Belgian theater director
Nicolaes Lauwers (1600–1652), Flemish engraver
Vinny Lauwers (born 1967), Australian sailor
Willy Lauwers (1936–1959), Belgian racing cyclist

See also
Lauwers

Dutch-language surnames
Surnames of Belgian origin
Patronymic surnames